Nigel Gavin is a New Zealand based musician and composer, best known as a guitar player. In addition to being a highly regarded solo artist and session musician, Nigel has been a member of bands such as popular New Zealand jazz quartett The Nairobi Trio, Robert Fripp's The League of Crafty Guitarists, klezmer "Jews Brothers", and Jonathan Besser's Bravura, as well as collaborator with artists such as folk singers Luke Hurley, Wayne Gillespie and Lorina Harding, Maori soul diva Whirimako Black, multi-instrumentalist Tom Ludvigson, jazz singer Caitlin Smith and harmonica maestro Brendan Power. He has a vast musical vocabulary which ranges from acoustic blues and folk to jazz, rock, fusion, surf pop, complex ambient grooves and various world music genres, in particular klezmer. Nigel's original jazz compositions cross boundaries of genre and combine musical traditions. He has toured extensively and performed at numerous music and art festivals in New Zealand, America, Australia and Europe. 
An active mentor to young artists, Nigel founded and mentored the New Zealand guitar collective concept bands Gitbox and Gitbox Rebellion. As a constant innovator, he is a regular contributor to the Auckland experimental music salon Vitamin S and has given multimedia performances with photographer Ralph Talmont's photographs.

Solo albums
Nigel Gavin has recorded three solo albums. Music for Flem volume II, Thrum in 2003 and Visitation in 2007.

Instruments
Nigel started out as a bass player and is best known as a guitarist but should probably be described as a stringed instrument player. His signature instrument is a 7-string acoustic guitar, made by New Zealand luthier Laurie Williams. His favourite electric guitars are a Fender Telecaster and an Ibanez 7-string, both of which he uses with a variety of effects. He also plays a Yamaha 6-string steel string acoustic, acoustic and electric mandolins, a banjo and an 11-string Godin Glissentar – in effect a fretless electric oud with the same scale and size as a conventional guitar. He is also a proficient piano player and percussionist.
Nigel often employs live loops in both performance and recording, using a custom effects box with a large variety of foot pedals. 
He plays with both fingers and a pick but also has been known to strike, pick, strum and pluck an instrument's strings with a variety of implements, including a pipe cleaner.

Discography

References

 
 Trevor Reekie, Moments Like These: Nigel Gavin, NZ Musician, 2009. Vol: 14 No: 8
 Andrew Healey, Nigel Gavin – One out of the Box, NZ Musician, 2007. Vol: 13 No: 4

External links
Nigel Gavin – Official Home Page
AudioCulture profile
Nigel Gavin's "Thrum" in iTunes
Blog entry about the cover of Richard Adams's and Nigel Gavin's "Recent Works" by collaborator, photographer Ralph Talmont

Living people
New Zealand composers
Male composers
New Zealand guitarists
New Zealand male guitarists
Seven-string guitarists
Crafty guitarists
Year of birth missing (living people)
Sony Music New Zealand artists